Walnut in an unincorporated community in Madison County, North Carolina, United States.  The community is named after the Walnut Mountains, located further north.  Centered along Barnard Road (SR 1151), it is accessible via NC 213 and Walnut Drive (SR 1439), both connecting to nearby US 25/US 70 and northwest of Marshall.  The community is part of the Asheville Metropolitan Statistical Area.

References

Unincorporated communities in Madison County, North Carolina
Asheville metropolitan area
Unincorporated communities in North Carolina